Scott Askham (born 20 May 1988) is an English mixed martial artist currently competing in the Middleweight division of KSW. A professional since 2010, he has also competed for the UFC, Absolute Championship Berkut, BAMMA, and Cage Warriors. He is currently ranked #2 in the KSW Middleweight rankings.

Background
Born and raised in West Yorkshire, Askham began training in mixed martial arts as a teenager and took part in several amateur fights before turning professional in 2010.  During this time, he also worked for a bit with a maintenance company installing street lighting.

Mixed martial arts career

Early career
Prior to his professional career, Askham held an amateur MMA record of 3–0. He made his professional debut competing as a middleweight for various regional promotions across Great Britain, including stints in Cage Warriors and BAMMA.  He was able to compile an undefeated record of 12–0 along the way, finishing a large portion of his fights in the first round.

After his TKO stoppage of Max Nunes in June 2014, Askham signed with the UFC.

Ultimate Fighting Championship
Askham made his promotional debut on 4 October 2014 as he faced Magnus Cedenblad at UFC Fight Night 53. Despite dropping Cedenblad with a front kick in round two, Askham was controlled through the rest of the fight, and was defeated via unanimous decision.

Askham next faced Antonio dos Santos Jr. on 20 June 2015 at UFC Fight Night 69.  Askham won the fight via KO in the first round.

Askham faced Krzysztof Jotko on 24 October 2015 at UFC Fight Night 76. He lost the fight by split decision.

Askham faced Chris Dempsey on 27 February 2016 at UFC Fight Night 84. He won the fight via knockout in the first round. He was also awarded a Performance of the Night bonus.

Askham was briefly scheduled to face Anthony Smith on 8 July 2016 at The Ultimate Fighter 23 Finale. However, Askham pulled out of the bout on 28 April and was replaced by Cezar Ferreira.

Following a quick recovery, Askham was rescheduled to face promotional newcomer Jack Hermansson on 3 September 2016 at UFC Fight Night 93. He lost the fight by unanimous decision.

Askham faced Brad Scott on 18 March 2017 at UFC Fight Night 107. He lost the fight by split decision and was subsequently released from the promotion.

Post-UFC career
Askham fought fellow British UFC veteran Luke Barnatt on 23 September 2017 in the main event at ACB 70. He won the fight by split decision.

On 10 December 2017 Askham revealed a three-fight contract with KSW. As the first fight of his contract and promotional debut, Askham faced former KSW Middleweight Champion Michał Materla at KSW 42: Khalidov vs. Narkun on March 3, 2018. Askham won the fight via technical knockout stemming from a body kick. He also won the Knockout of the Night bonus.

As the second fight and the semifinal of KSW Middleweight tournament, Askham faced Marcin Wójcik at KSW 45: The Return to Wembley on October 6, 2018. Askham won the fight via body kick and punches, winning his second Knockout of the Night bonus in the organization.

In the final fight of his contract Askham fought in the KSW Middleweight Tournament Final, winning a rematch against Michał Materla via flying knee knockout and becoming the KSW Middleweight Champion.

Askham faced Mamed Khalidov in a catchweight bout at KSW 52 on December 7, 2019. He won the bout via unanimous decision.

Askham was scheduled to defend his KSW Middleweight Championship in a rematch against Mamed Khalidov at KSW 55: Askham vs. Khalidov 2 on October 10, 2020. He lost the fight via first-minute knockout.

Championships and accomplishments

Mixed martial arts
Ultimate Fighting Championship
Performance of the Night (One time) vs. Chris Dempsey
Absolute Championship Berkut
Fight of the Night (One time) vs. Luke Barnatt
Konfrontacja Sztuk Walki
KSW Middleweight Championship (One time)
2019 KSW Middleweight tournament winner. 
Fight of the Night (One time) 
Knockout of the Night (Two times) vs. Michał Materla, Marcin Wójcik
BAMMA
BAMMA Middleweight Championship (One time)
One successful title defense
Ultimate Cage FC
UCFC Middleweight Championship (One time)

Mixed martial arts record

|-
|Loss
|align=center|19–5 
| Mamed Khalidov
| KO (head kick and punches)
| KSW 55: Askham vs. Khalidov 2
|
|align=center|1
|align=center|0:36
|Łódź, Poland
|
|-
|Win
|align=center|19–4 
| Mamed Khalidov
| Decision (unanimous)
| KSW 52: Race
|
|align=center|3
|align=center|5:00
|Gliwice, Poland
| 
|-
|Win
|align=center|18–4 
| Michał Materla
| KO (flying knee)
| KSW 49: Soldić vs. Kaszubowski
|
|align=center|3
|align=center| 1:23
|Gdańsk/Sopot, Poland
| 
|-
|Win
|align=center|17–4
|Marcin Wójcik
|TKO (body kick and punches)
|KSW 45: The Return to Wembley
|
|align=center|1
|align=center|1:37
|London, England
|
|-
|Win
|align=center|16–4
|Michał Materla
|TKO (body kick)
|KSW 42: Khalidov vs. Narkun
|
|align=center|1
|align=center|1:09
|Łódź, Poland
|
|-
|Win
|align=center|15–4
|Luke Barnatt
|Decision (split)
|ACB 70: The Battle of Britain
|
|align=center| 3
|align=center| 5:00
|Sheffield, England
|
|-
|Loss
|align=center|14–4
|Brad Scott
|Decision (split)
|UFC Fight Night: Manuwa vs. Anderson
|
|align=center|3
|align=center|5:00
|London, England
|
|-
|Loss
|align=center|14–3
|Jack Hermansson
|Decision (unanimous)
|UFC Fight Night: Arlovski vs. Barnett
|
|align=center| 3
|align=center| 5:00
|Hamburg, Germany
|
|-
|Win
|align=center|14–2
|Chris Dempsey
| KO (punch and head kick)
|UFC Fight Night: Silva vs. Bisping
|
|align=center| 1
|align=center| 4:45
| London, England 
|
|-
|Loss
|align=center|13–2
|Krzysztof Jotko
|Decision (split)
|UFC Fight Night: Holohan vs. Smolka
|
|align=center|3
|align=center|5:00
|Dublin, Ireland
|
|-
|Win
|align=center|13–1
|Antônio dos Santos Jr.
|KO (punches and knees)
|UFC Fight Night: Jędrzejczyk vs. Penne
|
|align=center|1
|align=center|2:52
|Berlin, Germany
|
|-
|Loss
|align=center|12–1
|Magnus Cedenblad
|Decision (unanimous)
|UFC Fight Night: Nelson vs. Story 
|
|align=center|3
|align=center|5:00
|Stockholm, Sweden
|
|-
|Win
|align=center|12–0
|Max Nunes
|TKO (punches)
|BAMMA Fight Night: Southampton
|
|align=center|3
|align=center|1:50
|Southampton, England
|Defended the BAMMA Middleweight Championship.
|-
|Win
|align=center|11–0
|Jorge Luis Bezerra
|Decision (unanimous) 
|BAMMA 13
|
|align=center|3
|align=center|5:00
|Birmingham, England
|Won the BAMMA Middleweight Championship.
|-
|Win
|align=center|10–0
|Jack Marshman
|Decision (unanimous)
|Ultimate Cage FC 5
|
|align=center|3
|align=center|5:00
|Doncaster, England
|Won the UCFC Middleweight Championship.
|-
|Win
|align=center|9–0
|Henry McLeman
|Submission (rear-naked choke) 
|BAMMA 12 
|
|align=center|3
|align=center|4:13
|Newcastle upon Tyne, England
|
|-
|Win
|align=center|8–0
|Denniston Sutherland
|Decision (unanimous)
|Cage Warriors: 50
|
|align=center|3
|align=center|5:00
|Glasgow, Scotland
|
|-
|Win
|align=center|7–0
|Dai Cook
|KO (head kick) 
|Caged Steel FC 3
|
|align=center|1
|align=center|0:35
|Doncaster, England
|
|-
|Win
|align=center|6–0
|Mark Jones
|TKO (punches)
|Ultimate Cage FC 4 
|
|align=center|1
|align=center|0:35
|Batley, England
|
|-
|Win
|align=center|5–0
|Aurelijus Kerpe
|Submission (rear-naked choke)
|Caged Steel FC 2
|
|align=center|1
|align=center|2:04
|Doncaster, England
|
|-
|Win
|align=center|4–0
|Matt Earnshaw
|TKO (punches)
|Caged Steel FC 1
|
|align=center|1
|align=center|N/A
|Doncaster, England
|
|-
|Win
|align=center|3–0
|Arunas Klimavicius
|TKO (punches)
|Olympian MMA Championship 11 
|
|align=center|1
|align=center|0:24
|Liverpool, England
|
|-
|Win
|align=center|2–0
|Shaun Lomas
|KO (head kick)
|Fight Pro UK 3
|
|align=center|1
|align=center|0:04
|Barnsley, England
|
|-
|Win
|align=center|1–0
|Rolandas Cizauskas
|TKO (punches)
|British Cage FC: Barnsley
|
|align=center|1
|align=center|N/A
|Barnsley, England
|
|-

Amateur mixed martial arts record

|-
| Win
| align=center| 6–0
| Dan Abbott
| Decision (unanimous)
| Fight-Stars 4
| 
| align=center| 2
| align=center| 5:00
| Wrexham, Wales
| 
|-
| Win
| align=center| 5–0
| Avi Jack
| Decision (split)
| Fight-Pro UK: Barnsley Fight Night 2
| 
| align=center| 3
| align=center| 5:00
| Barnsley, England
| 
|-
| Win
| align=center| 4–0
| Sam Boult
| Decision (majority)
| Fight-Pro UK: Barnsley Fight Night 1
| 
| align=center| 3
| align=center| 5:00
| Barnsley, England
| 
|-
| Win
| align=center| 3–0
| Qasim Shafiq
| Decision (unanimous)
| Phoenix Fight Promotions: D-Day
| 
| align=center| 3
| align=center| 5:00
| Rotherham, England
| 
|-
| Win
| align=center| 2–0
| Dan Edwards
| TKO (body kick)
| Ultimate Force: Nemesis
| 
| align=center| 1
| align=center| 2:48
| Doncaster, England
| 
|-
| Win
| align=center| 1–0
| Johnny Stuart
| Submission (arm-triange choke)
| Phoenix Fight Promotions: Elimination
| 
| align=center| 1
| align=center| 4:15
| Rotherham, England
|

See also
 List of current KSW fighters
 List of male mixed martial artists

References

External links

English male mixed martial artists
Middleweight mixed martial artists
Mixed martial artists utilizing Brazilian jiu-jitsu
Living people
People from the City of Wakefield
1988 births
English practitioners of Brazilian jiu-jitsu
People awarded a black belt in Brazilian jiu-jitsu
Sportspeople from Yorkshire
Ultimate Fighting Championship male fighters